Coligny Brainerd Metheny (December 30, 1889 – October 19, 1960) was an American football and basketball coach, college athletics administrator, and insurance executive. He served as the head football coach at Geneva College in Beaver Falls, Pennsylvania from 1913 to 1916, compiling a record of 17–15–2. Metheny was also the head basketball coach and athletic director at Geneva from 1914 to 1917. He played football and basketball at Geneva and football at the Carnegie Institute of Technology in 1912.

Metheny served as a pilot in the United States Army during World War I. He was later a prominent life insurance executive in Pittsburgh. He was president of Metheny and Associates with an office in the Grant Building. Metheny died on October 19, 1960, at Providence Hospital in Beaver Falls. In 1961, Geneva College named its new field house after Metheny.

Head coaching record

College

References

1889 births
1960 deaths
American businesspeople in insurance
American football fullbacks
American football halfbacks
Carnegie Mellon Tartans football players
Geneva Golden Tornadoes athletic directors
Geneva Golden Tornadoes football coaches
Geneva Golden Tornadoes football players
Geneva Golden Tornadoes men's basketball coaches
Geneva Golden Tornadoes men's basketball players
American World War I pilots
Businesspeople from Pittsburgh
Sportspeople from Pittsburgh
Coaches of American football from Pennsylvania
Players of American football from Pittsburgh
Basketball coaches from Pennsylvania
Basketball players from Pittsburgh